The U.S.–Israel Joint Economic Development Group (JEDG) is the annual bilateral meeting between Israel and the United States meant to discuss economic conditions in both countries and possible economic reforms that could be taken by the Government of Israel. Since 2003, fiscal and other economic conditions for the $9 billion U.S.-Israel Loan Guarantee Commitment Agreement (LGCA) have been signed by the U.S. Department of State and U.S. Department of the Treasury and the Israeli Ministry of Finance at the JEDG.  The last JEDG took place on June 29, 2009, in Washington, D.C. The last Mid-Year Review of the U.S.-Israel loan guarantee agreement took place on December 15, 2009.

External links
2009 Mid-Year Review
2009 JEDG Press Release
2009-10 Conditions

Israel–United States relations
Economy of Israel